Chhanera railway station is a small railway station in Khandwa district, Madhya Pradesh. Its code is CAER. It serves Chhanera town. The station consists of three platforms, neither of which is well sheltered. It lacks many facilities including water and sanitation.

References

Railway stations in Khandwa district
Bhopal railway division